This is a list of members of the South Australian Legislative Council from 1905 to 1908.

It was the second Legislative Council to be fully determined by provisions of the (State) Constitution Act 779 of 1901, which provided for, inter alia, a reduction in the number of seats from 24 to 18, realignment of District borders to encompass Assembly electorates, six-year terms (one half of the Council retiring every three years), and elections held jointly with the House of Assembly. 1905 being the year of the first MHA election under the new system, and terms of MLCs being for six years, no Legislative Council elections were held in this year.

References
Parliament of South Australia — Statistical Record of the Legislature

Members of South Australian parliaments by term
20th-century Australian politicians